Naval Medical Center San Diego (NMCSD), also known as Bob Wilson Naval Hospital and informally referred to as "Balboa Hospital", or "The Pink Palace" (because the stucco of the first buildings that were constructed was pinkish in color), is a technologically advanced Navy medical treatment facility. Located within the grounds of Balboa Park in San Diego,  the hospital has played a role in the history of San Diego for more than 100 years.  The goal has remained constant, to provide the finest medical care in a family-centered care environment to operational forces, their families, and veterans. Organizationally, the hospital is first and foremost a military command.

Development
As the United States entered World War I, San Diegans offered the nearly empty Balboa Park after the 1915 Panama–California Exposition to be used by various branches of the U.S. military for barracks and training purposes. During this time, a hospital tent was set up at the present location of the San Diego Natural History Museum. In September 1919, city leaders set aside a  parcel at Inspiration Point in Balboa Park for use in constructing a permanent Naval hospital. About $1.25 million was appropriated for the construction of the hospital; which would supplement the medical services provided aboard a fleet assigned hospital ship. The first unit opened in 1925.

During World War II, due to large numbers of casualties coming from the Pacific Theater of Operations, the hospital expanded to include most of the buildings in present-day Balboa Park. For instance, the Navy Nurses were housed at the House of Hospitality and the California Building, Fine Arts Gallery and the San Diego Natural History Museum were converted into hospital wards. The Lily Pond was used for swim training, the Japanese Tea Garden as a Red Cross Servicemen's Center, the House of Pacific Relations as officers' quarters and the Palisades as a Hospital Corps School named Camp Kidd. The Balboa Complex, to include the main Naval Hospital, treated approximately 172,000 patients with a maximum occupancy of 12,000 in December, 1944. In 1946 the Balboa Park grounds and buildings were returned to the city.

During the Vietnam War-era, the complex was the largest military hospital in the world.

An entirely new $270 million hospital complex was built in Florida Canyon, north of the original hospital, during the mid-1980s; the site was chosen at the urging of then-U.S. Representative Bob Wilson, after whom the new hospital complex was subsequently named. It officially opened in January 1988. A  portion of the original site was returned to the city of San Diego and restored to Park use.

Current status
The center has five medical mobilization teams including the hospital ship  whose personnel are drawn from the hospital staff. These teams deploy to the Western Pacific and Southeast Asia at various times during the year.

The hospital is a major training facility associated with the Uniformed Services University of Health Sciences.  The hospital is affiliated with the University of California, San Diego, Children's Hospital and Health Center, Scripps Clinic and Research Foundation in La Jolla and other institutions where Navy trainees perform rotations as integral parts of their residency or fellowship programs.  The hospital also maintains a school on the grounds for training enlisted medical personnel.

The hospital operates clinics  at area military installations, where ambulatory care is provided to the active duty population. Nine other clinics are located in San Diego and are available to family members and retirees.

Research and testing

A leader in the medical field, the hospital is also a major teaching and research center.

As one of Navy medicine's active teaching hospital, graduate medical education programs are conducted in anesthesiology, dermatology, emergency medicine, general surgery, internal medicine, obstetrics and gynaecology, ophthalmology, otolaryngology, orthopedics, pathology, pediatrics, psychiatry, psychology, radiology, urology, general practice dentistry, oral and maxillofacial surgery, nurse anesthesia, and hospital pharmacy.

Namesake 
On May 8, 2008, the hospital Medical Center San Diego was dedicated to San Diego Congressman Bob Wilson. The main entrance road leading to the hospital grounds is also named for him, Bob Wilson Drive.

References

Bibliography

External links 

Naval Medical Center San Diego website

Military hospitals in the United States
Hospitals in San Diego
Medical installations of the United States Navy
Military in San Diego
Balboa Park (San Diego)
1917 establishments in California
Military facilities in San Diego County, California
Hospital buildings completed in 1925